Lac de Naussac is a lake in Lozère, France. At an elevation of 945 m, its surface area is 10.8 km².

Naussac